Niklas Nordgren (born June 28, 1979) is a Swedish former professional ice hockey forward who began and finished his career playing for Modo Hockey in the Swedish Hockey League (SHL).

Playing career
Nordgren was drafted by the Carolina Hurricanes in Round 8, 195th overall at the 1997 NHL Entry Draft, but remained in Sweden and made his Swedish Elitserien debut with Modo Hockey in 1998–99.  Nordgren became a regular in the Elite League with Timrå IK in 2001–02 and played four seasons there.

Nordgren made the transition to North America in 2005–06, and split time between Carolina and their AHL affiliate Lowell before being traded to the Pittsburgh Penguins with Krystofer Kolanos and a 2007 2nd-round pick at the March 9th trade deadline for forward Mark Recchi.

On May 10, 2006, Nordgren signed a deal with the Rapperswil-Jona Lakers, based in Switzerland, where he would play the next five seasons.

After a season stint in returning to the SHL with Timrå IK, Nordgren signed for his original club Modo during the 2013-14 season on November 27, 2013.

Career statistics

References

External links

1979 births
Living people
Carolina Hurricanes draft picks
Carolina Hurricanes players
IF Sundsvall Hockey players
Lowell Lock Monsters players
Modo Hockey players
People from Örnsköldsvik Municipality
Pittsburgh Penguins players
Swedish expatriate sportspeople in Switzerland
Swedish expatriate ice hockey players in the United States
Swedish ice hockey right wingers
Timrå IK players
Sportspeople from Västernorrland County